The U.S. Virgin islands dry forest is a sub-tropical dry forest spanning the United States Virgin Islands with varying degrees of coverage on each island. Dry forests can receive 850-1100mm of precipitation per year. In the case of the U.S. Virgin islands forest high quantities of sea salt from the ocean decreases the growth height of the trees, aiding in the creation of two canopy layers that are commonly found at an elevation below 300 meters. Additionally the unique wind pattern that the islands create may have added to this effect.

Within the three islands that make up the United States Virgin Islands, St. John has maintained a higher percentage of dry forest cover competing with St. Thomas at 43.1%; St. Croix has limited dry forest cover (9.22%). St. John and St. Thomas topography has significant steep hills and slopes compared to St. Croix. St. John is the most protected of the three islands, and as such it has the largest extensive tropical dry forests in the U.S. Virgin Islands. The island contains 650 native plants, 5,000 or more terrestrial insects, over 180 species of birds, of which 90% are native, and six native mammal bat species. One of the most common trees in the “native dry forest garden” is the amarat. They are acacias, (casha bush) but do not have thorns likes most other varieties.

Zones and Characteristics

The Virgin Islands Dry Forest are divided into four zones, Semi-evergreen, Semi-deciduous, Drought-deciduous, and Gallery semi-deciduous forest. Precisely 70-75% of Semi-evergreen forest consists of transitional characteristics of moist and dry forest. These characteristics consist of trees that maintain an evergreen pigmentation annually. Semi-evergreen forest usually grows in area that has the most moisture in the dry forest. This tends to be the edge of the dry forest at altitudes of 984 feet and decreasing. Semi-evergreen forest can be found on the steep slopes of St. John at Maho Bay, Crown Mountain St. John and Mount Eagle St. Croix. Common plants found in Semi-evergreen forest are Epiphytic plants, commonly referred as air-plants. These air-plants are often sited midcenter of the forest in Estate Grove on St. Croix.

Semi-deciduous forest consist of 25% of evergreen trees and 75% of trees that tend to abandon their leaves, during cooler months. Semi-Deciduous forest relatively covers majority of land on all three islands. This is zone usually forms on Northern hill regions of each island. Semi-Deciduous forest can easily be found mid-island and Estate Northside on St. Croix.  However, this location is limited to St. Croix, this division of forest can also be found Southern Magens Bay, Leinster Bay St. John and Southern Spray Bay on Water Island.  Researchers speculate Semi-deciduous forest were not as dry as it seems, it is possible a community of plants that thrived in moist soil were present more than a decade before observations were recorded. The morphology of trees are quite distinct. In addition, this forest is separated in subdivisions classified as upper layer and bottom layer. The upper layer consists of small trees ranging from 8–11 meters and large trees 15–20 meters high. Bottom region is filled with a variety of saplings that grows from the leaf undercover. A few plants commonly found in this area are tan-tan (Leucaena leucocephala) and guinea grass (Megathyrsus maximus).

Drought deciduous forest and Gallery semi-deciduous forest has high quantities of deciduous trees (75%) unlike semi-evergreen forest and semi-deciduous forest. However, the distinct difference between Drought-deciduous and Gallery semi-deciduous forest is where they develop. Drought-deciduous tends to form on slopes, although, Gallery semi-deciduous forest grow in guts that lacks moisture. Gallery semi-deciduous forest are only found in guts in St. John, St. Thomas and St. Croix.  The forest is found in upper land area in St. John, Peterborg hillside in St. Thomas and Mahogany Gut/ Caledonia in St. Croix. This forest is quite too semi-deciduous forest, however, in comparison to trees of the same species grow taller in Gallery semi-deciduous forest vs. semi-deciduous forest due to the saturation of moisture from the rain in the guts.

Drought Deciduous forest are not as popular as semi-evergreen and semi-deciduous. Less than 1% of this forest inhabits St. Croix and Water Island, however, St. John has the greatest abundance located in eastern hillside regions. In addition, St. Thomas also occupies Drought Deciduous forest in Peterborg.

Researchers typically identify Drought Deciduous forest near low elevations ranging lower than 250 meters usually, yet not limited to southern arid slopes. In addition, this zone also consisted of upper and lower layers; upper layers consist of the canopy ranging from 7–10 meters, with a minimum of tall trees up to 15 meters tall. Lower layers consist of shrub species that dries out rapidly compared to tall tree species. Trees commonly found in this forest is turpentine (Syncarpia glomulifera).

Rare Plants

The Solanum conocarpum also to referred as the Marron bacora is considered a rare plant that was discovered in the evergreen forest in St. John. Dispersal biology and organisms that consume the plant are uncertain (Gibney and Ray). In the late 1990s, five individuals were sighted and recorded in the mid-elevation forests of St. John. Subsequently, in February 2003, over 150 additional individuals were found by David Hamada on the island of St. John. As part of its conservation effort, the plant has since been planted at various other locations, including St. George's Village Botanical Gardens on St. Croix, the University of the VIrgin Islands' St. Thomas campus and Fairchild Botanical Gardens in Miami. Researchers have established the lack of seedlings is correlated to the lack of saplings. The seeds derived from a fruit that has fragile seed coating. With the lack of individuals in the wild, cross fertilization is challenging. Therefore, achieving reproduction in the wild is primarily unsuccessful.

Disturbances

The most common disturbances of Semi-evergreen disturbances are development of roads caused by human invasion. Creating new roads dirt and paved roads cause soil erosion that leads to depleted soil nutrients. The development of roads, buildings and rock crushing companies significantly decrease plant diversity and animal diversity. A dramatic example is the development of roads on Crown Mountain St. Thomas. This leads to extinction of plants, fungi and animals diversity. The lack of tree cover leads to an increase of arid regions.

Semi-Deciduous forest also has challenging issues of disturbances. Disturbance effects are mainly caused by human interference. The land is manipulated for agriculture use frequently.

Due to the unique diversity of the forests and animal species, the Virgin Islands dry forests need to be protected. In 2004, 315 terrestrial species in the Virgin Islands were on the International Union for Conservation of Nature Red List (IUCN Red List) of Threatened Species. The islands serve as a wintering ground for birds such as the Cape May Warbler (Dendroica tigrine), Black-throated Blue Warbler (D. caerulescens), and Prairie Warbler (D. discolor). The intact forests are then necessary for the perpetuation of these Warbler species .

Interspecies Interactions

St. Croix Anole lizards tend to prey on ants significantly.

References

Bibliography

External links
Tropical and subtropical dry broadleaf forests Tropical and subtropical dry broadleaf forests St. George Village Botanical Garden

Tropical Dry Forest|Ecology